A show cave—also called tourist cave, public cave, and, in the United States, commercial cave—is a cave which has been made accessible to the public for guided visits.

Definition

A show cave is a cave that has been made accessible to the public for guided visits, 
where a cave is defined as a natural occurring void beneath the surface of the earth, per the International Show Caves Association.

A show cave may be managed by a government or commercial organization and made accessible to the general public, usually for an entrance fee. Unlike wild caves, they may possess regular opening hours, guided group tours, constructed trails and stairs, color artificial illumination and other lighting, musical/video/laser shows and concerts, elevators, small trains, and boats if they contain underground water features. Some caves (mainly in Asia) open to the public have temples, monasteries and religious statues or monuments. Some caves are visited by millions of tourists annually. 

The term is used inconsistently between nations: many countries tend to call all caves which are open to the public show caves or public caves in contrary to all other caves which are not allowed to enter. However, there are many such caves which are not developed with trails, light and tours, which are visited by very many people. This kind of cave is often called a semi-wild cave. 
Access may involve anything between an easy stroll and dangerous climbing. 
Most cave accidents happen in this kind of cave, as visitors underestimate the difficulties and dangers.

History

The oldest known show cave in the world is probably Reed Flute Cave in China with inscriptions from 792 in the time of the T'ang Dynasty. Other old show caves are Postojna Cave in Slovenia, with the presumed first record of a cave tour in 1213. Other early show caves are Jasov Cave in Slovakia with inscriptions from 1452, the Sontheimer Höhle in Germany which was reportedly visited by Herzog Ulrich von Württemberg on 20 May 1516 and Vilenica Cave in Slovenia where entrance fees were taken from 1633 on. In 1649, the first "authorized" cave guide started guiding Baumannshöhle in the Harz in Germany though this cave was intensively visited much earlier.

The development of electric lighting enabled the illumination of show caves. Early experiments with electric light in caves were carried out by Lieutenant Edward Cracknel in 1880 at Chifley Cave, Jenolan Caves, Australia. In 1881, Sloupsko-Šošůvské Jeskyně, Czech Republic, became the first cave in the world with electric arc light. This light did not use light bulbs, but electric arc lamps with carbon electrodes, which burned down and had to be replaced after some time.

The first cave in the world with electric light bulbs as we know them today was the Kraushöhle in Austria in 1883. But the light was abandoned after only seven years and then visited with carbide lamps for decades. Today the cave is guided with handheld LED lamps. In 1884, two more caves were equipped with electric light, Postojna Cave, Slovenia, and Olgahöhle, Germany.

Because of the unwanted development of lampenflora (algae attracted to heat and light) around incandescent electric lights in show caves, many of these attractions, such as Ingleborough Cave in England, have switched to cooler-temperature LED lighting.

Notable show caves (in alphabetical order)
Caves of Aggtelek Karst and Slovak Karst, Hungary/Slovakia
Akiyoshidai Cave, Yamaguchi, Japan
Alisadr Cave, Alisadr, Hamedan, Iran (largest water cave)
Angitis, near Prosotsani, Greece (longest underground river cave)
Atta Cave, Attendorn, Germany
Aven d'Orgnac, Orgnac-l'Aven, France
Avshalom Cave (Absalom Cave, Soreq Cave), Israel
Bacho Kiro cave, near Dryanovo, Bulgaria (the first show cave in Bulgaria inaugurated in 1937)
Batu Caves, near Kuala Lumpur, Malaysia
Bears' Cave, Chişcău village, Bihor County, Romania
Cuevas de Bellamar, Matanzas, Cuba
Bing Cave in Bavaria, Germany
Blanchard Springs Caverns in Arkansas, United States
Blanche Cave, Naracoorte, South Australia, Australia
Blue Grotto sea cave, in Biševo island, Dalmatia, Croatia
Buchan Caves, Victoria, Australia
Grottes de Calès, near Lamanon, France
Cango Caves, Oudtshoorn, South Africa
Capricorn Caves, Rockhampton, Queensland, Australia
Castellana Caves, near Bari, Italy
Carlsbad Caverns in New Mexico, United States
Cascade Caverns, Boerne, Texas, United States
Cathedral Caves, South Island, New Zealand
Cave Without a Name, near Boerne, Texas, United States
Craighead Caverns in Tennessee, United States
Cross Cave, Slovenia
Crystal Cave (Ohio) in Put-In-Bay, Ohio, United States (The world's largest known geode, a celestine geode 35 feet (11 m) in diameter at its widest point)
Dan yr Ogof in Powys, Wales
Dechen Cave, Iserlohn, Germany
Deer Cave, near Miri, Sarawak, Malaysia
Dirou Pyrgos Caves (Glyfada Cave and Alepotrypa cave) with underground river, Pyrgos Dirou, Greece
Devil's Throat Cave, Western Rhodope Mountains, near Gyovren, Bulgaria 
Dobšiná Ice Cave, Slovakia
Doolin Cave (Pol an Ionain) in Doolin, Ireland
Cuevas del Drach (Dragon Caves) on Mallorca, Balearic Islands, Spain (with concerts)
Dupnisa Cave, Kırklareli, Turkey
Eisriesenwelt, near Salzburg, Austria
Erdmanns Cave near Lörrach, Germany
Fantastic Caverns near Springfield, Missouri
Frasassi Caves, Ancona, Italy
Grotta Gigante, Trieste, Italy
Grutas de Cacahuamilpa, Guerrero, Mexico
Gunns Plains Cave in Tasmania island, Australia
Coves dels Hams on Mallorca, Balearic Islands, Spain
Caves of Han-sur-Lesse (Grottes de Han), Belgium
Harrison's Cave, Barbados
Hato Caves, near Willemstad, Curaçao
Hazrat Daoud pilgrimage cave near Nurobod, Uzbekistan
Caves of Hercules, Cape Spartel, Morocco
Horne Lake Caves near Nanaimo, British Columbia, Canada
Caves of Hotton, Belgium
Howe Caverns in New York, United States
Huanglong Cave in Zhangjiajie-Wulingyuan, Hunan, China
Ingleborough Cave, England
Inner Space Cavern, Georgetown, Texas, United States
Jeita Grotto, Lebanon
Jenolan Caves in the Blue Mountains, New South Wales, Australia (oldest caves, with concerts)
Kazumura Cave in Kīlauea Hawaiian Islands, United States (the largest and deepest lava tube system)
Kartchner Caverns State Park near Benson, Arizona, United States
Koněprusy Caves, Czech Republic
Kungur Ice Cave in Kungur near Perm, Russia
Cave of the Lakes, Kastria, Greece
Lamprechtsofen, near Salzburg, Austria
Ledenika, near Vratsa, Balkan Mountains, Bulgaria
Lewis and Clark Caverns in Montana, United States
Linville Caverns in Marion, North Carolina, United States
Luray Caverns in Virginia, United States
Magura Cave, near Belogradchik, Balkan Mountains, Bulgaria (with concerts)
Mammoth Cave in Kentucky, United States (longest caves system)
Manjanggul in Jeju Island, South Korea (lava tube)
Marble Cave, Crimea, Ukraine
Marble Arch Caves in County Fermanagh, Northern Ireland
Mark Twain Cave, near Hannibal, Missouri, United States
Melissani Cave, underground lake in Cephalonia island, Greece
Meramec Caverns, near Stanton, Missouri, United States
Mladeč Caves, Czech Republic
Moravian Karst, near Blansko, Czech Republic
Caves of Nahal Me'arot, Wadi el-Mughara (four Caves Creek), near Haifa, Israel
Natural Bridge Caverns in Comal County, Texas, United States
Neptune's Grotto sea cave near Alghero in Sardinia, Italy
Caves of Nerja in Nerja, Málaga, Spain (with concerts)
New Athos Cave, near New Athos, Georgia (with mini-metro)
Ohio Caverns in Ohio, United States
Orlova Chuka Cave, Danubian Plain, near Ruse, Bulgaria
Painted Cave, Galdar on Gran Canaria, Canary Islands, Spain
Phong Nha Cave, Quang Binh, Vietnam
Poole's Cavern, England
Caverne du Pont-d'Arc show cave replica of Chauvet Cave, Vallon-Pont-d'Arc, France
Postojna Cave, Postojna, Slovenia (the longest show cave in Europe and the birthplace of speleobiology; with small trains and concerts)
Reed Flute Cave (Lúdí Yán), Guilin, Guangxi, China
Resava Cave, Serbia
Saeva dupka, Pre-Balkan, near Lovech, Bulgaria
Scărișoara Cave, Gârda de Sus, Alba County, Romania
Seven-star Cave (Qīxīng Yán), Guilin, Guangxi, China
Shaitan-Koba, Crimea, Ukraine
Skelska Cave, Crimea, Ukraine
Škocjan Caves, Matavun, Slovenia
Syrau Drachen Cave, Syrau, Germany
Smoo Cave, Scotland
Snezhanka Cave, Rhodope Mountains, near Peshtera, Bulgaria
Caverns of Sonora, Sonora, Texas, United States
Cave of El Soplao, Cantabria, Spain
St. Michael's Cave, Gibraltar (with concerts)
Tabon Caves, near Quezon, Palawan, Philippines
Tapolca Caves with underground river, Tapolca, Hungary
Thiên Đường Cave, Đồng Hới, Vietnam
Uhlovitsa Cave, Rhodope Mountains, near Smolyan, Bulgaria
Caves of Valeron, Santa María de Guía de Gran Canaria, Canary Islands, Spain
Cueva del Viento, on Tenerife, Canary Islands, Spain (the largest lava tube system in Europe)
Cueva de los Verdes, Haría on Lanzarote, Canary Islands, Spain (lava tube)
La Verna cave in Sainte-Engrâce, France (with the largest chamber in a show cave)
Verteba cave, Ukraine
Vilenica Cave, Slovenia (the oldest show cave in Europe)
Vjetrenica Cave, Bosnia and Herzegovina
Vorontsova Cave near Sochi, Russia
Výpustek Cave, Czech Republic
Waitomo Caves, New Zealand
Wonder Cave, San Marcos, Texas, United States
Wookey Hole Caves, Somerset, England
Yagodinska Cave, Western Rhodope Mountains, near Smolyan, Bulgaria (the longest cave in the Rhodope Mountains, contains a very large number of cave formations, including the rare cave pearls)
Zbrašov Aragonite Caves, Czech Republic

See also
List of caves in Austria
List of caves in Bulgaria
List of show caves in Germany
List of caves in Italy

References

External links
International Show Caves Association (I.S.C.A.)
Show Caves of the World showcaves.com
United States show caves directory by state goodearthgraphics.com
US National Caves Association cavern.com
Show Caves of the World - list List of Show Caves in the World
Karst and Cave Protection Commission